Laguna Blanca National Park is a National Park in the west of the , close to the town of Zapala.

The park around the lagoon was created in 1940 to protect the lagoon and particularly the population of black-necked swans (Cygnus melancoryphus). It has an area of 112.5 km². The lagoon is situated in the Patagonian steppe, surrounded by hills and gorges.

It has important aquatic bird fauna, of several species and in great number.

The lagoon used to host the largest known subpopulation of the endemic Patagonia frog (Atelognathus patagonicus), but this has been extirpated by introduced predatory fish; the species survives in isolated ponds in the buffer zone of the national park.

Near the lagoon is the Salamanca cave, historically inhabited by humans, where rock paintings, typical of northern Patagonia, can be seen. Other mapuche and prehistoric human artifacts have been found in the park.

Climate

The park has an arid and windy climate with a large diurnal range. Snowfall can occur during the winter months.

References 

Biosphere reserves of Argentina
National parks of Argentina
Protected areas of Neuquén Province
Protected areas established in 1940
Ramsar sites in Argentina